Constantin Guirma (February 5, 1920 – August 6, 2010) was a Burkinabé prelate of the Roman Catholic Church .

Guirma was born in Kaya, Burkina Faso and was ordained a priest on May 19, 1946. He was appointed Bishop of the Diocese of Kaya on June 26, 1969, and ordained bishop on August 1, 1969, by Pope Paul VI in Kampala during his first pontifical visit to Africa. Guirma remained there until his retirement on March 9, 1996. He died after illness on August 6, 2010.

External links
Catholic-Hierarchy

20th-century Roman Catholic bishops in Burkina Faso
People from Centre-Nord Region
1920 births
2010 deaths
Roman Catholic bishops of Kaya